The Villanova Wildcats men's soccer program represents Villanova University in all NCAA Division I men's college soccer competitions. Founded in 1978, the Wildcats compete in the Big East Conference. The Wildcats are coached by Tom Carlin. Villanova plays their home matches at Higgins Soccer Complex.

Seasons

Year-by-year

NCAA tournament results

References

External links 
 

 
1982 establishments in Pennsylvania
Association football clubs established in 1982